Alsaker is a surname. Notable people with the surname include:

Øyvind Alsaker (born 1965), Norwegian sports journalist and television personality
Paal Christian Alsaker (born 1973), Norwegian footballer
Rasmus Larssen Alsaker (1883-1960), Norwegian-born American physician and alternative health writer
Svein Alsaker (born 1940), Norwegian politician